Vichada may refer to:
Department of Vichada, a subdivision of Colombia
Vichada River, a river in eastern Colombia
Vichada Structure, impact structure in Colombia